Robert William Kozaren (June 5, 1934 – 2007) was a Polish American and Democratic politician born in Detroit, Michigan. He served as Mayor of the City of Hamtramck, Michigan from 1980 to 1997. Elected to nine terms, he was the longest-serving mayor of Hamtramck.

Kozaren was president of the city council (and a former deputy city clerk) when he entered the primary for the mayoral election in the fall of 1979. At the time, Hamtramck came to symbolize the Rust Belt. He beat the sitting mayor "with a message of hope and renewal". At six-foot-six, Kozaren was an impressive figure walking down the street and enjoyed being personable with the people of his town. His enthusiasm and people skills were cited as a reason for his success at the polls and his eighteen year reign as mayor.

References

External links

1934 births
Mayors of places in Michigan
American politicians of Polish descent
Michigan Democrats
2007 deaths
20th-century American politicians